Loxostege tesselalis is a species of moth in the family Crambidae. It is found in France, Spain and on Corsica.

The wingspan is 26–28 mm.

References

Moths described in 1854
Pyraustinae
Moths of Europe